Perlman is an Ashkenazi Jewish surname. Notable people with the surname include:

 Alfred E. Perlman, railroad executive
 Anita Perlman, see B'nai B'rith Girls
 Eliezer Yitzhak Perlman, birth name of Eliezer Ben-Yehuda, a Jewish Litvak lexicographer, the driving spirit behind the revival of the Hebrew language in the modern era.
Elio Perlman, the protagonist of André Aciman's novel Call Me by Your Name
 Elliot Perlman, author and barrister
 Fredy Perlman, anarchist author, publisher, and activist
 Isadore Perlman, American chemist
 Itzhak Perlman (born 1945), Israeli-American violinist, conductor, and pedagogue
 Janet Perlman (born 1954), Canadian animator and children's book author and illustrator
 Nathan David Perlman, lawyer and politician
 Philip B. Perlman, United States Solicitor General and Maryland Secretary of State
 Radia Perlman, software designer and network engineer
 Ralph Perlman, Louisiana state budget director, 1967–1988
 Rhea Perlman, actress
 Ron Perlman, actor
 Selig Perlman, economist and labor historian
 Stanley Perlman, American microbiologist
 Steve Perlman (entrepreneur), entrepreneur and inventor
 Suzanne Perlman (1922–2020), Hungarian-Dutch visual artist

See also
 Pearlman
 Perelman

Jewish surnames